Mladen Mitrović (born 19 March 1995) is a Serbian football defender who plays for Car Konstantin.

Career
Born in Niš, Mitrović passed the youth school of Radnički Niš. He started playing senior football with Timočanin in 2013, as a loaned player. He also spent a period from 2014 to 2015 with Sinđelić Niš, and for the 2015–16 season, he was loaned to Car Konstantin at dual registration. He made his SuperLiga debut for Radnički Niš in a 30 fixture match against Rad on 10 April 2016. Previously, he made one cup match, against Loznica in first half of the same season.

References

External links
 
 Mladen Mitrović stats at utakmica.rs
 Mladen Mitrović stats at footballdatabase.eu

1995 births
Living people
Sportspeople from Niš
Association football defenders
Serbian footballers
FK Timočanin players
FK Sinđelić Niš players
FK Car Konstantin players
FK Radnički Niš players
Serbian SuperLiga players